Bolan University of Medical and Health Sciences  is a medical university located in Quetta, Balochistan,  Pakistan.

History
The college was established during Ataullah Mengal's reign as Chief Minister in 1972 by the then Education Minister Mir Gul Khan Nasir both were from National Awami Party(Wali group) and has graduated over 2,900 students (c. 2003). It was the recipient of a Japan International Cooperation Agency grant of 488 million yen in 1995. The new building was operational in 1996.

BUMHS was conceived in 2004. Initial process was thus started to get it established. However, it could not be materialised till 2017 when the Bolan University of Medical and Health Sciences Bill, 2017 was passed by the Balochistan Provincial Assembly on 11 December 2017. The BUMHS ACT, 2017 was approved by Honourable Governor of Balochistan, Mr. Muhammad Khan Achakzai on 20 December 2017. The notification of BUMHS was issued on 22 December 2017 while it was published in Gazette of Balochistan in March 2018. Prof. Dr. Naqib Ullah Achakzai was appointed as First Vice Chancellor of Bolan University of Medical and Health Sciences Quetta on 1 August 2018.

Accreditation
It is accredited by the College of Physicians & Surgeons Pakistan to teach medicine, hematology, neurosurgery, obstetrics and gynecology, ophthalmology, otorhinolaryngology, pediatrics, psychiatry and surgery.

References

External links

Medical colleges in Balochistan, Pakistan
Universities and colleges in Quetta District
Public universities and colleges in Balochistan, Pakistan
1972 establishments in Pakistan